Individual jumping equestrian at the 2006 Asian Games was held in Doha Equestrian Jumping Arena, Doha, Qatar from December 10 to December 12, 2006.

Schedule
All times are Arabia Standard Time (UTC+03:00)

Results
Legend
EL — Eliminated
WD — Withdrawn

Qualifier

Final

References
Results

External links
Official website

Individual jumping